Methane clathrate (CH4·5.75H2O) or (8CH4·46H2O), also called methane hydrate, hydromethane, methane ice, fire ice, natural gas hydrate, or gas hydrate, is a solid clathrate compound (more specifically, a clathrate hydrate) in which a large amount of methane is trapped within a crystal structure of water, forming a solid similar to ice.  Originally thought to occur only in the outer regions of the Solar System, where temperatures are low and water ice is common, significant deposits of methane clathrate have been found under sediments on the ocean floors of the Earth. Methane hydrate is formed when hydrogen-bonded water and methane gas come into contact at high pressures and low temperatures in oceans.

Methane clathrates are common constituents of the shallow marine geosphere and they occur in deep sedimentary structures and form outcrops on the ocean floor. Methane hydrates are believed to form by the precipitation or crystallisation of methane migrating from deep along geological faults. Precipitation occurs when the methane comes in contact with water within the sea bed subject to temperature and pressure. In 2008, research on Antarctic Vostok Station and EPICA Dome C ice cores revealed that methane clathrates were also present in deep Antarctic ice cores and record a history of atmospheric methane concentrations, dating to 800,000 years ago. The ice-core methane clathrate record is a primary source of data for global warming research, along with oxygen and carbon dioxide.

Methance clathrates could be a potential source of abrupt climate change, following the clathrate gun hypothesis. In this scenario, heating causes a tipping points in the climate system, where oceans and soils cause a massive release of methane from the hydrates,  causing further global warming. Exactly what will cause such a release and in which geography is not certain by scientists.

General
Methane hydrates were discovered in Russia in the 1960s, and studies for extracting gas from it emerged at the beginning of the 21st century.

Structure and composition

The nominal methane clathrate hydrate composition is (CH4)4(H2O)23, or 1 mole of methane for every 5.75 moles of water, corresponding to 13.4% methane by mass, although the actual composition is dependent on how many methane molecules fit into the various cage structures of the water lattice. The observed density is around 0.9 g/cm3, which means that methane hydrate will float to the surface of the sea or of a lake unless it is bound in place by being formed in or anchored to sediment. One litre of fully saturated methane clathrate solid would therefore contain about 120 grams of methane (or around 169 litres of methane gas at 0 °C and 1 atm), or one cubic metre of methane clathrate releases about 160 cubic metres of gas.

Methane forms a "structure-I" hydrate with two dodecahedral (12 vertices, thus 12 water molecules) and six tetradecahedral (14 water molecules) water cages per unit cell. (Because of sharing of water molecules between cages, there are only 46 water molecules per unit cell.) This compares with a hydration number of 20 for methane in aqueous solution. A methane clathrate MAS NMR spectrum recorded at 275 K and 3.1 MPa shows a peak for each cage type and a separate peak for gas phase methane. In 2003, a clay-methane hydrate intercalate was synthesized in which a methane hydrate complex was introduced at the interlayer of a sodium-rich montmorillonite clay. The upper temperature stability of this phase is similar to that of structure-I hydrate.

Natural deposits

Methane clathrates are restricted to the shallow lithosphere (i.e. < 2,000 m depth). Furthermore, necessary conditions are found only in either continental sedimentary rocks in polar regions where average surface temperatures are less than 0 °C; or in oceanic sediment at water depths greater than 300 m where the bottom water temperature is around 2 °C. In addition, deep fresh water lakes may host gas hydrates as well, e.g. the fresh water Lake Baikal, Siberia. Continental deposits have been located in Siberia and Alaska in sandstone and siltstone beds at less than 800 m depth. Oceanic deposits seem to be widespread in the continental shelf (see Fig.) and can occur within the sediments at depth or close to the sediment-water interface. They may cap even larger deposits of gaseous methane.

Oceanic
Methane hydrate can occur in various forms like massive, dispersed within pore spaces, nodules, veins/fractures/faults, and layered horizons. Generally, it is found unstable at standard pressure and temperature conditions, and 1 m3 of methane hydrate upon dissociation yields about 164 m3 of methane and 0.87 m3 of freshwater. There are two distinct types of oceanic deposits.  The most common is dominated (> 99%) by methane contained in a structure I clathrate and generally found at depth in the sediment.  Here, the methane is isotopically light (δ13C < −60‰), which indicates that it is derived from the microbial reduction of CO2.  The clathrates in these deep deposits are thought to have formed in situ from the microbially produced methane since the δ13C values of clathrate and surrounding dissolved methane are similar.  However, it is also thought that freshwater used in the pressurization of oil and gas wells in permafrost and along the continental shelves worldwide combines with natural methane to form clathrate at depth and pressure since methane hydrates are more stable in freshwater than in saltwater.  Local variations may be widespread since the act of forming hydrate, which extracts pure water from saline formation waters, can often lead to local and potentially significant increases in formation water salinity.  Hydrates normally exclude the salt in the pore fluid from which it forms. Thus, they exhibit high electric resistivity like ice, and sediments containing hydrates have higher resistivity than sediments without gas hydrates (Judge [67]).

These deposits are located within a mid-depth zone around 300–500 m thick in the sediments (the gas hydrate stability zone, or GHSZ) where they coexist with methane dissolved in the fresh, not salt, pore-waters. Above this zone methane is only present in its dissolved form at concentrations that decrease towards the sediment surface. Below it, methane is gaseous. At Blake Ridge on the Atlantic continental rise, the GHSZ started at 190 m depth and continued to 450 m, where it reached equilibrium with the gaseous phase. Measurements indicated that methane occupied 0-9% by volume in the GHSZ, and ~12% in the gaseous zone.

In the less common second type found near the sediment surface, some samples have a higher proportion of longer-chain hydrocarbons (< 99% methane) contained in a structure II clathrate. Carbon from this type of clathrate is isotopically heavier (δ13C is −29 to −57 ‰) and is thought to have migrated upwards from deep sediments, where methane was formed by thermal decomposition of organic matter. Examples of this type of deposit have been found in the Gulf of Mexico and the Caspian Sea.

Some deposits have characteristics intermediate between the microbially and thermally sourced types and are considered formed from a mixture of the two.

The methane in gas hydrates is dominantly generated by microbial consortia degrading organic matter in low oxygen environments, with the methane itself produced by methanogenic archaea. Organic matter in the uppermost few centimeters of sediments is first attacked by aerobic bacteria, generating CO2, which escapes from the sediments into the water column. Below this region of aerobic activity, anaerobic processes take over, including, successively with depth, the microbial reduction of nitrite/nitrate, metal oxides, and then sulfates are reduced to sulfides.  Finally, methanogenesis becomes a dominant pathway for organic carbon remineralization.

If the sedimentation rate is low (about 1  cm/yr), the organic carbon content is low (about 1% ), and oxygen is abundant, aerobic bacteria can use up all the organic matter in the sediments faster than oxygen is depleted, so lower-energy electron acceptors are not used. But where sedimentation rates and the organic carbon content are high, which is typically the case on continental shelves and beneath western boundary current upwelling zones, the pore water in the sediments becomes anoxic at depths of only a few centimeters or less.  In such organic-rich marine sediments, sulfate becomes the most important terminal electron acceptor due to its high concentration seawater. However, it too is depleted by a depth of centimeters to meters.  Below this, methane is produced. This production of methane is a rather complicated process, requiring a highly reducing environment (Eh −350 to −450 mV) and a pH between 6 and 8, as well as a complex syntrophic, consortia of different varieties of archaea and bacteria. However, it is only archaea that actually emit methane.

In some regions (e.g., Gulf of Mexico, Joetsu Basin) methane in clathrates may be at least partially derive from thermal degradation of organic matter (e.g. petroleum generation), with oil even forming an exotic component within the hydrate itself that can be recovered when the hydrate is disassociated. The methane in clathrates typically has a biogenic isotopic signature and highly variable δ13C (−40 to −100‰), with an approximate average of about −65‰ . Below the zone of solid clathrates, large volumes of methane may form bubbles of free gas in the sediments.

The presence of clathrates at a given site can often be determined by observation of a "bottom simulating reflector" (BSR), which is a seismic reflection at the sediment to clathrate stability zone interface caused by the unequal densities of normal sediments and those laced with clathrates.

Gas hydrate pingos have been discovered in the Arctic oceans Barents sea. Methane is bubbling from these dome-like structures, with some of these gas flares extending close to the sea surface.

Reservoir size

The size of the oceanic methane clathrate reservoir is poorly known, and estimates of its size decreased by roughly an order of magnitude per decade since it was first recognized that clathrates could exist in the oceans during the 1960s and 1970s. The highest estimates (e.g. 3 m3) were based on the assumption that fully dense clathrates could litter the entire floor of the deep ocean. Improvements in our understanding of clathrate chemistry and sedimentology have revealed that hydrates form in only a narrow range of depths (continental shelves), at only some locations in the range of depths where they could occur (10-30% of the Gas hydrate stability zone), and typically are found at low concentrations (0.9–1.5% by volume) at sites where they do occur. This estimate, corresponding to 500–2500 gigatonnes carbon (Gt C), is smaller than the 5000 Gt C estimated for all other geo-organic fuel reserves but substantially larger than the ~230 Gt C estimated for other natural gas sources. The permafrost reservoir has been estimated at about 400 Gt C in the Arctic, but no estimates have been made of possible Antarctic reservoirs. These are large amounts. In comparison, the total carbon in the atmosphere is around 800 gigatons (see Carbon: Occurrence).

These modern estimates are notably smaller than the 10,000 to 11,000 Gt C (2 m3) proposed by previous researchers as a reason to consider clathrates to be a geo-organic fuel resource (MacDonald 1990, Kvenvolden 1998). Lower abundances of clathrates do not rule out their economic potential, but a lower total volume and apparently low concentration at most sites does suggest that only a limited percentage of clathrates deposits may provide an economically viable resource.

Continental
Methane clathrates in continental rocks are trapped in beds of sandstone or siltstone at depths of less than 800 m. Sampling indicates they are formed from a mix of thermally and microbially derived gas from which the heavier hydrocarbons were later selectively removed. These occur in Alaska, Siberia, and Northern Canada.

In 2008, Canadian and Japanese researchers extracted a constant stream of natural gas from a test project at the Mallik gas hydrate site in the Mackenzie River delta. This was the second such drilling at Mallik: the first took place in 2002 and used heat to release methane. In the 2008  experiment, researchers were able to extract gas by lowering the pressure, without heating, requiring significantly less energy. The Mallik gas hydrate field was first discovered by Imperial Oil in 1971–1972.

Commercial use
Economic deposits of hydrate are termed natural gas hydrate (NGH) and store 164 m3 of methane, 0.8 m3 water in 1 m3 hydrate.  Most NGH is found beneath the seafloor (95%) where it exists in thermodynamic equilibrium.  The sedimentary methane hydrate reservoir probably contains 2–10 times the currently known reserves of conventional natural gas, . This represents a potentially important future source of hydrocarbon fuel. However, in the majority of sites deposits are thought to be too dispersed for economic extraction. Other problems facing commercial exploitation are detection of viable reserves and development of the technology for extracting methane gas from the hydrate deposits.

In August 2006, China announced plans to spend 800 million yuan (US$100 million) over the next 10 years to study natural gas hydrates. Bjørn Kvamme and Arne Graue at the Institute for Physics and technology at the University of Bergen have developed a method for injecting  into hydrates and reversing the process; thereby extracting CH4 by direct exchange. The University of Bergen's method is being field tested by ConocoPhillips and state-owned Japan Oil, Gas and Metals National Corporation (JOGMEC), and partially funded by the U.S. Department of Energy. The project has already reached injection phase and was analyzing resulting data by March 12, 2012.

On March 12, 2013, JOGMEC researchers announced that they had successfully extracted natural gas from frozen methane hydrate. In order to extract the gas, specialized equipment was used to drill into and depressurize the hydrate deposits, causing the methane to separate from the ice. The gas was then collected and piped to surface where it was ignited to prove its presence. According to an industry spokesperson, "It [was] the world's first offshore experiment producing gas from methane hydrate". Previously, gas had been extracted from onshore deposits, but never from offshore deposits which are much more common. A spokesperson for JOGMEC remarked "Japan could finally have an energy source to call its own". Marine geologist Mikio Satoh remarked "Now we know that extraction is possible. The next step is to see how far Japan can get costs down to make the technology economically viable." Japan estimates that there are at least 1.1 trillion cubic meters of methane trapped in the Nankai Trough, enough to meet the country's needs for more than ten years.

Both Japan and China announced in May 2017 a breakthrough for mining methane clathrates, when they extracted methane from hydrates in the South China Sea. China described the result as a breakthrough; Praveen Linga from the Department of Chemical and Biomolecular Engineering at the National University of Singapore agreed "Compared with the results we have seen from Japanese research, the Chinese scientists have managed to extract much more gas in their efforts". Industry consensus is that commercial-scale production remains years away.

Environmental concerns
Experts caution that environmental impacts are still being investigated and that methane—a greenhouse gas with around 25 times as much global warming potential over a 100-year period (GWP100) as carbon dioxide—could potentially escape into the atmosphere if something goes wrong. Furthermore, while cleaner than coal, burning natural gas also creates carbon dioxide emissions.

Hydrates in natural gas processing

Routine operations
Methane clathrates (hydrates) are also commonly formed during natural gas production operations, when liquid water is condensed in the presence of methane at high pressure. It is known that larger hydrocarbon molecules like ethane and propane can also form hydrates, although longer molecules (butanes, pentanes) cannot fit into the water cage structure and tend to destabilise the formation of hydrates.

Once formed, hydrates can block pipeline and processing equipment. They are generally then removed by reducing the pressure, heating them, or dissolving them by chemical means (methanol is commonly used). Care must be taken to ensure that the removal of the hydrates is carefully controlled, because of the potential for the hydrate to undergo a phase transition from the solid hydrate to release water and gaseous methane at a high rate when the pressure is reduced. The rapid release of methane gas in a closed system can result in a rapid increase in pressure.

It is generally preferable to prevent hydrates from forming or blocking equipment. This is commonly achieved by removing water, or by the addition of ethylene glycol (MEG) or methanol, which act to depress the temperature at which hydrates will form. In recent years, development of other forms of hydrate inhibitors have been developed, like Kinetic Hydrate Inhibitors (increasing the required sub-cooling which hydrates require to form, at the expense of increased hydrate formation rate) and anti-agglomerates, which do not prevent hydrates forming, but do prevent them sticking together to block equipment.

Effect of hydrate phase transition during deep water drilling
When drilling in oil- and gas-bearing formations submerged in deep water, the reservoir gas may flow into the well bore and form gas hydrates owing to the low temperatures and high pressures found during deep water drilling. The gas hydrates may then flow upward with drilling mud or other discharged fluids. When the hydrates rise, the pressure in the annulus decreases and the hydrates dissociate into gas and water. The rapid gas expansion ejects fluid from the well, reducing the pressure further, which leads to more hydrate dissociation and further fluid ejection. The resulting violent expulsion of fluid from the annulus is one potential cause or contributor to the "kick". (Kicks, which can cause blowouts, typically do not involve hydrates: see Blowout: formation kick).

Measures which reduce the risk of hydrate formation include:
 High flow-rates, which limit the time for hydrate formation in a volume of fluid, thereby reducing the kick potential.
 Careful measuring of line flow to detect incipient hydrate plugging.
 Additional care in measuring when gas production rates are low and the possibility of hydrate formation is higher than at relatively high gas flow rates.
 Monitoring of well casing after it is "shut in" (isolated) may indicate hydrate formation. Following "shut in", the pressure rises while gas diffuses through the reservoir to the bore hole; the rate of pressure rise exhibit a reduced rate of increase while hydrates are forming.
 Additions of energy (e.g., the energy released by setting cement used in well completion) can raise the temperature and convert hydrates to gas, producing a "kick".

Blowout recovery

At sufficient depths, methane complexes directly with water to form methane hydrates, as was observed during the Deepwater Horizon oil spill in 2010. This involved placing a  dome over the largest of the well leaks and piping it to a storage vessel on the surface. This option had the potential to collect some 85% of the leaking oil but was previously untested at such depths. BP deployed the system on May 7–8, but it failed due to buildup of methane clathrate inside the dome; with its low density of approximately 0.9 g/cm3 the methane hydrates accumulated in the dome, adding buoyancy and obstructing flow.

Methane clathrates and climate change

Natural gas hydrates for gas storage and transportation
Since methane clathrates are stable at a higher temperature than liquefied natural gas (LNG) (−20 vs −162 °C), there is some interest in converting natural gas into clathrates (Solidified Natural Gas or SNG) rather than liquifying it when transporting it by seagoing vessels. A significant advantage would be that the production of natural gas hydrate (NGH) from natural gas at the terminal would require a smaller refrigeration plant and less energy than LNG would. Offsetting this, for 100 tonnes of methane transported, 750 tonnes of methane hydrate would have to be transported; since this would require a ship of 7.5 times greater displacement, or require more ships, it is unlikely to prove economically feasible.. Recently, methane hydrate has received considerable interest for large scale stationary storage application due to the very mild storage conditions with the inclusion of tetrahydrofuran (THF) as a co-guest. With the inclusion of tetrahydrofuran, though there is a slight reduction in the gas storage capacity, the hydrates have been demonstrated to be stable for several months in a recent study at −2 °C and atmospheric pressure. A recent study has demonstrated that SNG can be formed directly with seawater instead of pure water in combination with THF.

See also
 Future energy development
 Long-term effects of global warming
 The Swarm (Schätzing novel)
Unconventional (oil & gas) reservoir

Notes

References

External links
Are there deposits of methane under the sea? Will global warming release the methane to the atmosphere?  (2007)
Methane seeps from Arctic sea bed (BBC)
Bubbles of warming, beneath the ice (LA Times 2009)
online calculator : hydrate formation conditions with different EOSs

Research
Centre for Arctic Gas Hydrate, Environment and Climate (CAGE)
Center for Hydrate Research
USGS Geological Research Activities with U.S. Minerals Management Service - Methane Gas Hydrates
Carbon Neutral Methane Energy Production from Hydrate Deposits (Columbia University)

Video
USGS Gas Hydrates Lab (2012)
Ancient Methane Explosions Created Ocean Craters (2017)

Clathrate hydrates
Hydrocarbons
Methane
Unconventional gas
Natural gas